Laugnac is a  commune in the southwest of France, located in the center of  department of Lot-et -Garonne ( region Nouvelle-Aquitaine). Small village also called "Capital of Lot-et-Garonne" due to its geographical location.

Its inhabitants are called  Laugnacais  and  Laugnacaises .

See also
Communes of the Lot-et-Garonne department

References

Communes of Lot-et-Garonne